The milk-rejection sign is a medical sign in which an infant rejects a nursing mother's milk from a particular breast. It is a marker of possible breast cancer.

References 

Medical signs
Breast cancer
Breastfeeding